The Fighting Buckaroo is a 1943 American Western film directed by William Berke and starring Charles Starrett, Kay Harris and Arthur Hunnicutt.

Main cast
 Charles Starrett as Steve Harrison 
 Kay Harris as Carol Comstock 
 Arthur Hunnicutt as Arkansas
 Ernest Tubb as Ernie 
 Johnny Luther's Ranch Boys as Cowhands & Musicians

References

Bibliography
 Pitts, Michael R. Western Movies: A Guide to 5,105 Feature Films. McFarland, 2012.

External links
 

1943 films
1943 Western (genre) films
1940s English-language films
American Western (genre) films
Columbia Pictures films
Films directed by William A. Berke
American black-and-white films
1940s American films